Ever After (known in promotional material as Ever After: A Cinderella Story) is a 1998 American romantic period drama film inspired by the Charles Perrault fairy tale, "Cinderella". It is directed by Andy Tennant and stars Drew Barrymore, Anjelica Huston, Dougray Scott, Jeanne Moreau, Megan Dodds, Melanie Lynskey, Patrick Godfrey, Lee Ingleby, Richard O'Brien, Timothy West, and Judy Parfitt. Tennant, Susannah Grant and Rick Parks wrote the screenplay. George Fenton composed the original music score. The film's closing theme song, "Put Your Arms Around Me", is performed by the rock band Texas.

The film removes the pantomime and supernatural elements that are commonly associated with the Cinderella tale and instead treats the story as historical fiction, setting it in Renaissance-era France. It is considered to be a modern, post-feminist interpretation of the fairy tale.

Ever After was well received by critics and was a box office success.

Plot

 
The Brothers Grimm meet with the Grand Dame, who expresses disappointment in their version of Cinderella. She produces a jeweled slipper and recounts Cinderella’s actual story.

In 16th century France, eight-year-old Danielle is the daughter of widowed merchant Auguste de Barbarac. Auguste returns home with his new wife, Baroness Rodmilla De Ghent, and her two daughters from her previous marriage, Marguerite and Jacqueline. A fortnight later, Auguste dies of a heart attack.

Ten years later, Auguste’s estate is in debt due to Rodmilla’s overspending, while Danielle has been forced to become a servant in her own home. One morning, Danielle encounters Prince Henry as he is attempting to flee in order to avoid an arranged marriage to Princess Gabriella of Spain. He gives Danielle some gold coins to keep their interlude secret and rides away. He is eventually caught by the Royal Guard after stopping Romani bandits from robbing Leonardo da Vinci, whom King Francis has invited to the French court.

Danielle, disguised as a noblewoman, takes the gold coins to the palace to buy back a family servant sold by Rodmilla. Henry witnesses Danielle arguing with the jailer and, impressed by her passion, orders the servant released. Captivated by her intelligence, Henry asks for her name. Danielle hastily lies and gives her mother’s name: Comtesse Nicole de Lancret. Later that night, King Francis strikes a deal with Henry: he will hold a masquerade ball at which Henry will announce his engagement to the woman of his choosing, or else marry Princess Gabriella. Hearing this news, Rodmilla accelerates her efforts at getting Henry to notice Marguerite, while being increasingly neglectful to Jacqueline. Danielle begins secretly spending time with Henry. She impresses the bandits and they invite the couple to their camp, where they share their first kiss.

Marguerite plans to wear an exquisite gown and jeweled slippers, which had been left to Danielle by her mother, for the ball; leading to Danielle attacking Marguerite for insulting her mother's memory. Marguerite retaliates by destroying the copy of Utopia that Auguste had given Danielle. After Rodmilla has Danielle whipped, Jacqueline treats her wounds, expressing sympathy for Danielle and criticizing Marguerite for her cruelty. 

Danielle tries to tell Henry the truth, but cannot bring herself to do so when he tells her she has changed him as a man, inspiring him to build a university. Rodmilla deduces that Henry has been romancing Danielle and tells Queen Marie that she is engaged. She confronts Danielle about her deception and the whereabouts of her mother’s dress and slippers, which have vanished, then locks her in the pantry. Da Vinci helps Danielle escape and the other servants, who are loyal to Danielle, reveal they had hidden the dress and slippers. Danielle arrives at the ball determined to tell Henry the truth, but Rodmilla exposes her before she can. Furious at her dishonesty, Henry rejects her. Danielle tearfully runs away, leaving a jeweled slipper behind. Da Vinci reproaches Henry for his callousness towards Danielle and leaves him the slipper.

Henry agrees to marry Princess Gabriella, but calls it off when he realizes she too loves someone else. Jacqueline tells Henry that Rodmilla sold Danielle to the lecherous Pierre Le Pieu. Henry rides off to rescue her, only to find that she has freed herself. Henry apologizes, professes his love for her and proposes marriage by fitting the slipper onto her foot; Danielle happily accepts.

Rodmilla is summoned before the royal court and confronted for lying to the Queen about Danielle; she is stripped of her title and threatened with exile unless someone speaks for her. Danielle, now a princess, appears and instead asks that Rodmilla be shown the same “kindness” her stepmother had shown her. Rodmilla and Marguerite are reduced to servants in the palace laundry; Jacqueline, for her kindness to Danielle, is spared from punishment. Leonardo gifts the royal newlyweds with a portrait of Danielle.

The Grande Dame tells the Brothers Grimm that her great-great grandmother's portrait hung in Henry's university until the French Revolution. She concludes by telling them while Danielle and Henry did live happily ever after, the point is that they lived.

Historical context
While the story is fictional, it involves several historical figures, places and events. The film is set in the 16th and 19th centuries and features Francis I, King Henry (later Henry II of France), Leonardo da Vinci, The Brothers Grimm, as well as allusions to the explorer Jacques Cartier, the fairy tale collector Charles Perrault, the French colonies in the New World, and the French Revolution.

Though the main portion of the film takes place in early 1500s France, the royals shown are most likely not meant to be the historical figures for which they are named. King Francis I summoned Leonardo da Vinci to his court around 1516, three years before King Henry II was born; neither of King Francis I's wives was named Marie (the first was named Claude and the second Eleanor). King Henry II was married to Catherine de' Medici at the age of 14 and had no known children with Diane de Poitiers, a French noblewoman of great influence and the historical figure most likely represented by Danielle.

Cast

Production
Ever After was filmed in Super 35.

Locations and sets
The castle shown in the film is the Château de Hautefort in the Dordogne region of France. Other featured châteaux are de Fénelon, de Losse, de Lanquais, de Beynac as well as the city of Sarlat-la-Canéda. The painting of Danielle is based on Leonardo da Vinci's Head of a Woman (La Scapigliata).

Reception
On Rotten Tomatoes, 91% of 65 reviews were positive, with an average score of 7.60/10. The critical consensus states: "Ever After is a sweet, frothy twist on the ancient fable, led by a solid turn from star Barrymore". On Metacritic it has score of 66 out of 100 based on 22 reviews. Audiences surveyed by CinemaScore gave the film a grade "A" on scale of A to F.

Lisa Schwarzbaum from Entertainment Weekly gave the film a B−, saying: "Against many odds, Ever After comes up with a good one. This novel variation is still set in the once-upon-a-time 16th century, but it features an active, 1990s-style heroine—she argues about economic theory and civil rights with her royal suitor—rather than a passive, exploited hearth sweeper who warbles "A Dream Is a Wish Your Heart Makes"". She also praised Anjelica Huston's performance as a cruel stepmother: "Huston does a lot of eye narrowing and eyebrow raising while toddling around in an extraordinary selection of extreme headgear, accompanied by her two less-than-self-actualized daughters—the snooty, social-climbing, nasty Marguerite, and the dim, lumpy, secretly nice Jacqueline. "Nothing is final until you're dead", Mama instructs her girls at the dinner table, "and even then I'm sure God negotiates"".

Chicago Sun-Times film critic, Roger Ebert, praises the film with three out of four stars and writes, "The movie [...] is one of surprises, not least that the old tale still has life and passion in it. I went to the screening expecting some sort of soppy children's picture and found myself in a costume romance with some of the same energy and zest as The Mask of Zorro. And I was reminded again that Drew Barrymore can hold the screen and involve us in her characters. [...] Here, as the little cinder girl, she is able to at last put aside her bedraggled losers and flower as a fresh young beauty, and she brings poignancy and fire to the role".

The film is recognized by American Film Institute in these lists:
 2002: AFI's 100 Years...100 Passions – Nominated

Home media
On March 2, 1999, the film was released on DVD & VHS. On January 4, 2011, the film was released on Blu-ray.

Musical adaptation

A report in 2012 indicated that a musical theatre production was in the works, with the book and lyrics by Marcy Heisler and music by Zina Goldrich. The musical was originally scheduled for its world premiere in April 2009 at the Curran Theatre in San Francisco, but the pre-Broadway run was postponed. In May 2012, the project was back on track with Kathleen Marshall signing on to direct a Broadway run.

A workshop of the musical was held from April 25, 2013 – May 15, 2013 with Sierra Boggess as Danielle, Jeremy Jordan as Prince Henry, and Ashley Spencer as Marguerite. The musical made its world premiere at the Paper Mill Playhouse from May 21, 2015 – June 21, 2015. Christine Ebersole played the role of Baroness Rodmilla de Ghent. Alongside Ebersole, Margo Seibert starred as Danielle, James Snyder as Henry, Charles Shaughnessy as King Francis, and Tony Sheldon as Leonardo da Vinci. Another production of the musical played at Atlanta's Alliance Theatre from January 15, 2019 to February 19. The production was directed by Susan V. Booth and starred Sierra Boggess as Danielle de Barbarac, Terry Burrell as Queen Marie, Todd Buonopane as Captain Laurent, David Garrison as Leonardo da Vinci, Chris Kayser as King Francis, Jeff McCarthy as Pierre Malette, Tim Rogan as Prince Henry and Rachel York as Baroness Rodmilla de Ghent.

References

External links

 
 
 
 
 

1998 films
1998 romantic drama films
1990s American films
1990s English-language films
1990s historical drama films
1990s historical romance films
20th Century Fox films
American historical drama films
American historical romance films
American romantic drama films
Cultural depictions of Francis I of France
Cultural depictions of Leonardo da Vinci
Films about orphans
Films about royalty
Films based on Charles Perrault's Cinderella
Films directed by Andy Tennant
Films scored by George Fenton
Films set in the 16th century
Films set in France
Films shot in France
Films with screenplays by Susannah Grant